Patricia Maliepo (born 13 March 2003) is a New Zealand rugby union player. She is a first five-eighth for Auckland and New Zealand.

Biography 
Maliepo debuted for Auckland in the Farah Palmer Cup as a 16-year-old in 2019. She impressed for the New Zealand Barbarians in 2020 against the Black Ferns. In 2021 she was named in the Blues women's squad for their historic Super Rugby match. She later made her Black Ferns debut off the bench when they played England in Exeter and appeared in three of four test matches against England and France.

Maliepo played for the Blues against the Chiefs in the first-ever women's Super Rugby match in New Zealand on 1 May 2021. On 3 November 2021, She was named in the Blues squad for the inaugural Super Rugby Aupiki competition.

Maliepo was named in the Blues starting line up for their first game, she scored a try against Matatū in their 21–10 victory. She also started in their 0–35 thrashing by the Chiefs Manawa in the final round.

Maliepo was initially named in the Black Ferns squad for the 2022 Pacific Four Series but was ruled out due to concussion.

Personal life 
Maliepo's brother, Moa, plays internationally for Romania.

References

External links 

 Black Ferns Profile

2003 births
Living people
New Zealand women's international rugby union players
New Zealand female rugby union players